Christian Baltzer (born 5 July 1936) is a French basketball player. He competed in the men's tournament at the 1956 Summer Olympics and the 1960 Summer Olympics.

References

External links

1936 births
Living people
French men's basketball players
1963 FIBA World Championship players
Olympic basketball players of France
Basketball players at the 1956 Summer Olympics
Basketball players at the 1960 Summer Olympics
Sportspeople from Mulhouse